Herholdt is a surname. Notable people with the surname include:

Johan Daniel Herholdt (1818–1902), Danish architect, professor, and royal building inspector
Sonja Herholdt (born 1952), South African singer-songwriter and actress